Toxorhynchites, also called elephant mosquito or mosquito eater, is a genus of diurnal and often relatively colorful mosquitoes, found worldwide between about 35° north and 35° south. Most species occur in forests. It is among the many kinds of mosquito that do not consume blood. The adults subsist on carbohydrate-rich materials, such as honeydew, or saps and juices from damaged plants, refuse, fruit, and nectar.

Mating in mid-air, males and females synchronize their wing beats to the same frequency. Eggs are deposited by flinging them onto water surfaces while hovering. They are either white or yellow in color, with an incubation period of 40–60 hours depending on the temperature. The older the female mosquito, the less likely the eggs will be healthy.

In contrast to blood-sucking species of mosquitoes, their larvae prey on the larvae of other mosquitoes and similar nektonic prey, making Toxorhynchites beneficial to humans. Living on this protein- and fat-rich diet, they have no need to risk their lives sucking blood in adulthood, having already accumulated the necessary materials for oogenesis and vitellogenesis. The larvae of one jungle variety, Toxorhynchites splendens, consume larvae of other mosquito species occurring in tree crevices, particularly Aedes aegypti.

Environmental scientists have suggested that Toxorhynchites mosquitoes be introduced to areas outside their natural range in order to fight dengue fever.  This has been practiced historically, but errors have been made.  For example, when intending to introduce T. splendens to new areas, scientists actually introduced T. amboinensis. Also an extinct species T. mexicanus is known from Miocene aged Mexican Amber.

Species 
The genus Toxorhynchites is divided into 4 subgenera and contains 90 species also included 1 extinct species:
Toxorhynchites bambusicola 
Toxorhynchites brevipalpis 
Toxorhynchites christophi 
Toxorhynchites grandiosus 
Toxorhynchites guadeloupensis 
Toxorhynchites haemorrhoidalis 
Toxorhynchites hexacis 
Toxorhynchites mariae 
Toxorhynchites minimus 
Toxorhynchites moctezuma 
Toxorhynchites portoricensis 
Toxorhynchites purpureus 
Toxorhynchites pusillus 
Toxorhynchites rajah 
Toxorhynchites rutilus 
Toxorhynchites solstitialis 
Toxorhynchites speciosus 
Toxorhynchites splendens 
Toxorhynchites theobaldi 
Toxorhynchites trichopygus 
Toxorhynchites violaceus 
Toxorhynchites inornatus  
Toxorhynchites acaudatus 	  	 	 	 
Toxorhynchites aurifluus 
Toxorhynchites bickleyi 
Toxorhynchites funestus 
Toxorhynchites gigantulus 
Toxorhynchites gravelyi 
Toxorhynchites klossi 
Toxorhynchites leicesteri 
 Toxorhynchites magnificus 
Toxorhynchites manopi 
Toxorhynchites metallicus 
Toxorhynchites nigripes 
Toxorhynchites amboinensis 
Toxorhynchites kamoisi 
Toxorhynchites moctezuma 
Toxorhynchites longgianeolata 
Toxorhynchites lewisi 
Toxorhynchites madagascarensis 
Toxorhynchites manicatus  
Toxorhynchites nairobiensi  
Toxorhynchites nepenthicola 
Toxorhynchites nigeriensis 
Toxorhynchites okinawensis 
Toxorhynchites pauliani 
Toxorhynchites phytophagus 
Toxorhynchites pendleburyi  
Toxorhynchites ramalingami 
Toxorhynchites rickenbachi 
Toxorhynchites raris 
Toxorhynchites rizzoi 
Toxorhynchites rodhaini 
Toxorhynchites ruwenzori  
Toxorhynchites sumatranus 
Toxorhynchites tyagii 
Toxorhynchites wolfsi 
Toxorhynchites angustiplatus 
Toxorhynchites edwardsi 
Toxorhynchites erythrurus 
Toxorhynchites evansae 
Toxorhynchites fontenillei 
Toxorhynchites gerbergi 
Toxorhynchites guadeloupensis 
Toxorhynchites grjebinei 
Toxorhynchites hypoptes 
Toxorhynchites indicus 
Toxorhynchites helenae 
Toxorhynchites cavalieri 
Toxorhynchites coeruleus 
Toxorhynchites darjeelingensis 
Toxorhynchites catharinensis  
Toxorhynchites capelai 
Toxorhynchites camaronis 
Toxorhynchites brunhesi 
Toxorhynchites bengalensis 
Toxorhynchites ater 
Toxorhynchites aeneus 
Toxorhynchites albipes 
Toxorhynchites dundo 
Toxorhynchites lutescens 
Toxorhynchites macaensis 
Toxorhynchites macaensis 
Toxorhynchites zairensis 
Toxorhynchites virdibasis  
Toxorhynchites kempi 
Toxorhynchites quasiferox 
Toxorhynchites lemuriae  
Toxorhynchites nepenthis  
Toxorhynchites angolensis 
†Toxorhynchites mexicanus

References

External links 
 Toxorhynchites at the Walter Reed Biosystematics Unit
 Video showing larvae of Toxorhynchites rutilus feeding on other mosquito larvae

 
Mosquito genera
Taxa named by Frederick Vincent Theobald